Peter Tatár (born September 10, 1953, Bratislava, Slovakia) became in 1990 a member of the Slovak National Council, i.e. Slovak parliament.
He was reelected in 1998–2002 term. He was leader of the Civic Conservative Party from 2001 till 2006.

References 

1953 births
Living people
Politicians from Bratislava
Public Against Violence politicians
Democratic Party (Slovakia, 1989) politicians
Civic Conservative Party (Slovakia) politicians
Members of the National Council (Slovakia) 1998-2002